Soľnička is a village and municipality in the Trebišov District in the Košice Region of south-eastern Slovakia.

Etymology
The name comes from Slavic Soľnik. "Soľ" (salt) + derivational suffix "-nik" meaning "salt store". 1359 Zolnuk, 1786 Solnocchska (Soľnička).

History

In historical records the village was first mentioned in 1332. In the late 17th century the plague devastated the village and three Csoma brothers - Janos, Gyorgy and Istvan were sent from the neighboring village of Lelesz, now Leles, Slovakia to repopulate the town.  The Csoma, Pataki, Buti and Szajko families were the main original families in the village.

During its history it was part of Ung Varmegye, and then Zemplen. After the World War II, the village become a part of newly formed Czechoslovakia. The village and most of the region was again a part of Hungary from 1938-1945 when it again reverted to Slovak control.  In 1945 Czech and Slovak troops surrounded the village and demanded that all ethnic Hungarians leave. They were to be deported with 50 kilos of personal belongings each. However the local judge had to sign the order and seeing that the judge was a Csoma, he refused to sign it, and after three days the troops left. There were major deportations from surrounding villages however the village is still over 95% Hungarian.

Geography
The village lies at an altitude of 117 metres and covers an area of 6.157 km².

Ethnicity
In 2011, the village had a population of 225. 84% Hungarians, 11% Slovaks, 4% Romani, 2% unknown.

Facilities
The village has a public library.

References

External links
 http://www.statistics.sk/mosmis/eng/run.html

Villages and municipalities in Trebišov District